Shidu Town is an urban town in Yanling County, Hunan Province, People's Republic of China.

Cityscape
The town is divided into 20 villages and one community, the following areas: Xizhengjie Community, Liangtian Village, Chexi Village, Xiaodong Village, Yangqi Village, Hongnan Village, Nanliu Village, Qingshigang Village, Pikeng Village, Mihua Village, Shenlong Village, Xiaojiang Village, Longkou Village, Macai Village, Meichong Village, Huangfengzhai Village, Dilong Village, Huangshang Village, Daping Village, Shangjing Village, and Gualiao Village.

References

External links

Divisions of Yanling County